PDZ domain-containing protein 2 is a protein that in humans is encoded by the PDZD2 gene.

Function 

Proteins containing PDZ domains have been shown frequently to bind the C-termini of transmembrane receptors or ion channels. They have also been shown to bind to other PDZ domain proteins and could possibly be involved in intracellular signalling. The protein encoded by this gene contains six PDZ domains and shares sequence similarity with pro-interleukin-16 (pro-IL-16). Like pro-IL-16, the encoded protein localizes to the endoplasmic reticulum and is thought to be cleaved by a caspase to produce a secreted peptide containing two PDZ domains. In addition, this gene is upregulated in primary prostate tumors and may be involved in the early stages of prostate tumorigenesis.

Interactions 

PDZD2 has been shown to interact with PKP4.

References

Further reading